Tomo Riba (July 1934, Arunachal Pradesh, India – 2000) was an Indian politician. He was the President of the Peoples Party of Arunachal and was the Chief Minister of Arunachal Pradesh from September 1979 to November 1979. He was elected to the 11th Lok Sabha, lower house of the Parliament of India from the Arunachal West constituency of Arunachal Pradesh in 1996. He died in 2000.

The first medical college of Arunachal Pradesh Tomo Riba Institute of Health and Medical Sciences is named after him.

References

External links
 Official Biographical Sketch in Lok Sabha Website

Chief Ministers of Arunachal Pradesh
India MPs 1996–1997
Lok Sabha members from Arunachal Pradesh
1937 births
2000 deaths
People's Party of Arunachal politicians
Chief ministers from People's Party of Arunachal
Arunachal Pradesh MLAs 1978–1980
Janata Dal politicians